Vincenzo II Gonzaga (7 January 1594 – 25 December 1627) was Duke of Mantua and Duke of Montferrat from 1626 until his death.

Vincenzo was the son of Duke Vincent I and Eleonora de' Medici and inherited the duchy upon the death of his elder brother Ferdinand, receiving the imperial investiture on 8 February 1627. He had also received a cardinalate upon Ferdinando's succession, but had dismissed it in 1616 in order to marry his relative Isabella Gonzaga, daughter of Alfonso Gonzaga, Count of Novellara.

Conscious of his poor health, the childless Vincenzo set up an inheritance for his lands through the marriage of his niece Maria (daughter of the former Duke Francis IV) with Charles of Nevers' son Charles of Gonzaga-Nevers. The elder Charles was a cousin of his father. Vincenzo died on the marriage day of Mary and Charles.

Family

Vincenzo II Gonzaga had no legitimate offspring from the wife, but he recognized four natural sons.

By Paola Scarpelli:
 Federico Gonzaga (1619–1630), Abbot of Lucledio.
Tiberio Silvio Gonzaga (1620 – 3 July 1630), Knight of the Order of Malta and Balì of Armenia.

By Luigia "the Spanish":
Luigi Gonzaga (+1627), Infante.
Giovanni Gonzaga (+Malta 1645), Abbot of Lucledio, and Knight of the Order of Malta.

Honours
 Grand Master of the Order of the Redeemer

Ancestry

References

|-

|-

1594 births
1627 deaths
Vincenzo 2
Vincenzo 2
Vincenzo 2
17th-century Italian cardinals
17th-century Italian nobility
Resigned cardinals
People from Gazzuolo